Danny Watts (born 31 December 1979) is a retired British professional racing driver.

Career
Watts was born in Aylesbury, and started racing in 1993, when he began karting. After five seasons of karting, he stepped up to single seater racing in 1998 in the UK Formula First championship, in which he dominated with 12 wins. He also competed in the Formula Palmer Audi Winter Series, in preparation for running the main Formula Palmer Audi championship the following year.

2000 saw a step up to the British Formula Renault Championship, when he was teammate to Kimi Räikkönen. In his third year of Formula Renault, he won the championship with 6 wins.

Watts ascended another tier in 2003, stepping up to the British Formula 3 Championship, with HiTech Racing. He took his first win in the series the same year in the second race at Castle Combe, having crashed out of the lead in race one. In 2004 he became the first driver for eleven years to win a round of the British Formula 3 Championship whilst not driving a car from the Dallara company.

2005 saw a mixed year for Watts. Unable to remain in Formula Three, he contested a handful of races in various disciplines. The same occurred in 2006, though he did make a brief return to F3 for the penultimate race of the season, at Thruxton, for champions Räikkönen Robertson Racing (co-owned by former British FRenault teammate, and now F1 star Kimi Räikkönen). In that race, Watts led the field and dominated proceedings with a convincing win.

In 2006 he raced in the Porsche Carrera Cup for the Redline Racing team. Initially he shared this drive with Richard Westbrook, only contesting races which clash with Westbrook's Porsche Carrera Cup racing, but after a run of 8 successive victories in the races he started, Richard conceded the drive full-time.

For 2007 Watts drove for Team LNT in the Le Mans Series in a Panoz Esperante GT-LM.  He was also invited to join A1 Team Great Britain for the 4th season of the 2007/8 season held in Shanghai, China and took part in the rookie sessions.

In 2008 he signed to the SAS Lechner Racing team with teammate Damien Faulkner for the F1-supporting Porsche Supercup series.

A1 Team Great Britain announced that Watts would race for A1 Team Great Britain in Chengdu; he came 3rd in both the sprint and feature race.

For 2009 he raced for Strakka Racing in the Le Mans Series and the 24 Hours of Le Mans driving a Ginetta-Zytek GZ09S. In the opening round of the Le Mans Series at Barcelona he claimed overall pole on the teams LMP1 debut.

In 2010 he retained his seat for Strakka Racing in the Le Mans Series however the team moved down to the LMP2 category now using a HPD ARX-01c. The car took the class victory at Le Mans finishing 5th overall.

The 2011 Le Mans season was good for Watts, once again being the strongest link in the team constantly qualifying the Strakka car high up the LMP2 field.

In 2012 Strakka retained Watts, who went on to put in a hero's drive at the World Endurance Championship round at Silverstone England, by doing a double stint of three-and-a-half hours to finish within 0.6 secs of 4th place.

Personal life
After retiring, he came out publicly in 2017 as gay. He was previously married to Fiona Leggate with whom he had one son.

Helmet
Watts' helmet colour is in honour of Oxford United Football Club, whom he supports.

Racing record

Career summary

Complete Porsche Supercup results
(key) (Races in bold indicate pole position – 2 points awarded 2008 onwards in all races) (Races in italics indicate fastest lap)

† – Did not finish the race, but was classified as he completed over 90% of the race distance.
‡ – Guest driver – Not eligible for points.

24 Hours of Le Mans results

Complete A1 Grand Prix results
(key) (Races in bold indicate pole position) (Races in italics indicate fastest lap)

Complete FIA World Endurance Championship results

References

External links
 danny-watts.com
 Danny Watts career statistics at Driver Database

1979 births
Living people
Sportspeople from Aylesbury
English racing drivers
British Formula Three Championship drivers
British Formula Renault 2.0 drivers
Formula Renault Eurocup drivers
A1 Team Great Britain drivers
Formula Palmer Audi drivers
24 Hours of Le Mans drivers
American Le Mans Series drivers
European Le Mans Series drivers
World Series Formula V8 3.5 drivers
Porsche Supercup drivers
FIA World Endurance Championship drivers
Blancpain Endurance Series drivers
English LGBT sportspeople
LGBT racing drivers
Gay sportsmen
Porsche Carrera Cup GB drivers
21st-century English LGBT people